Hugh Smith Haynie (February 6, 1927 – November 30, 1999) was an American political cartoonist.

Life
Haynie was born in Reedville, Virginia. He studied at the College of William and Mary in Virginia and at the University of Louisville in Kentucky. He also served in the United States Coast Guard during the end of World War II and the Korean War.

In 1958, Barry Bingham, Sr., hired Haynie to serve as a political cartoonist for the Louisville Courier-Journal, a position he held until his retirement in 1996, after which he was retained as an emeritus. His cartooning style was clean lined, heavily inked, and somewhat reminiscent of Al Capp. Haynie regularly penned his wife's name, Lois, into his drawings.

Haynie won several awards for his work. He won the Headliner Award in 1966 and the Freedoms Foundation Medal in 1966 and 1970. The Kentucky Civil Liberties Union named him Civil Libertarian of the Year in 1978, and he was inducted into the Kentucky Journalism Hall of Fame in 1987.

References

External links
 Hugh Haynie's cartoons on Facebook
 

1927 births
1999 deaths
American editorial cartoonists
Artists from Louisville, Kentucky
Burials at Cave Hill Cemetery
College of William & Mary alumni
Courier Journal people
People from Reedville, Virginia
University of Louisville alumni